Ashwani Arul Kumar (15 November 1950  – 7 October 2020) was a 1973-Batch IPS officer who served as Governor of the Indian state of Nagaland, and briefly as Governor of Manipur during 2013.

He was the DGP of Himachal Pradesh from August 2006 - July 2008 and;

He had served the elite Special Protection Group (SPG) as its deputy inspector general when Rajiv Gandhi was Prime Minister of India.

Ashwani handled and or investigated an Amit Shan and Shorabuddin Sheikh investigation. 

He was the Director of CBI between 2nd August 2008 to 30 November 2010.  

Ashwani Kumar died in the evening on the 7 of October 2020 in Brockhurst in Shimla due to suicide by hanging.

References

1950 births
2020 deaths
Indian police chiefs
Governors of Nagaland
Governors of Manipur
Rashtriya Indian Military College alumni
Directors of the Central Bureau of Investigation
Suicides by hanging in India
2020 suicides